Marian Czachor (8 December 1924 – 15 February 2018) was a Polish footballer. He played in one match for the Poland national football team in 1947.

References

External links
 

1924 births
2018 deaths
Polish footballers
Poland international footballers
People from Radom
Association football defenders
Radomiak Radom players